Aftandil Sabir oğlu Hacıyev (born 13 August 1981) is a retired Azerbaijani football defender and current manager of Sabail FK.

Hacıyev made 22 appearances for the Azerbaijan national football team from 2000 through 2006.

National team statistics

References

External links

1981 births
Living people
Azerbaijani footballers
Azerbaijan international footballers
Association football defenders
Azerbaijani football managers
Qarabağ FK players
Turan-Tovuz IK players
Sumgayit FK players
Footballers from Baku
Neftçi PFK players